Kariz Darreh (also Romanized as Kārīz Darreh) is a village in Jolgeh-ye Musaabad Rural District, in the Central District of Torbat-e Jam County, Razavi Khorasan Province, Iran. At the 2006 census, its population was 244, in 56 families.

References 

Populated places in Torbat-e Jam County